Penelope Ann "Penny" Chuter OBE (born 28 July 1942) is a British former international sculler, rowing coach and rowing administrator.

Chuter competed for Great Britain in the women's single scull event at the European Rowing Championships each year from 1960 to 1964, winning the silver medal in 1962. In 1964, she retired from international competition and started training as a physical education teacher.

In 1973, the Amateur Rowing Association (ARA) appointed Chuter as its first national coach with responsibility for women's rowing. She remained with the ARA for about twenty years, becoming its chief coach for men's rowing from 1979 to 1982, then Director of Coaching from 1982 to 1986 and Director of International Rowing from 1986 to 1990. Her trainees included a 1992 Olympian Wade Hall-Craggs.

Chuter received an OBE in 1989, and the FISA Distinguished Services to Rowing Award in 2006.

References

Further reading

1942 births
Living people
Rowing coaches
British female rowers
Officers of the Order of the British Empire
Sportspeople from Dunfermline
Scottish female rowers
European Rowing Championships medalists